Silver bream is the common name of several species of fish:
 Blicca bjoerkna (white bream), freshwater species of cyprinids from Europe and Western Asia
 Acanthopagrus australis (surf bream), marine and freshwater species of sea bream from eastern Australia
 Acanthopagrus berda (goldsilk seabream), marine species of sea bream from the Indian Ocean
 Acanthopagrus butcheri (southern black bream), marine and freshwater species of sea bream from southern Australia
 Rhabdosargus sarba (goldlined seabream), marine species of sea bream from the Indo-West Pacific
 Bidyanus bidyanus (silver perch), freshwater species of grunters endemic to the Murray–Darling river system in southeastern Australia
 Bidyanus welchi (Welch's grunter), freshwater species of grunters from Australia
 Pseudocaranx dentex (white trevally), marine species of jack widespread in tropical and warm temperate waters of the Atlantic, Indian, and Pacific Oceans, as well as the Mediterranean Sea
 Nemadactylus macropterus (tarakihi), marine species of morwong found off southern Australia, the Atlantic coast of South America, and New Zealand

See also
Bream
Sparidae (sea breams or porgies)

Fish common names